Mascato can refer to:

Colyaer Mascato S100, a Spanish flying boat
David Mascató, a Spanish sprint canoer